Kristian Jensen (born 21 May 1971 in Middelfart) is a Danish politician who was Minister for Foreign Affairs of Denmark from 2015 to 2016, Minister of Finance from 2016 to 2019 and Minister of Taxation from 2004 to 2010. Jensen is a member of the liberal party Venstre. He briefly served as acting chairman of Venstre in 2019. From 1998 to 2021 he was a member of the Folketing.

Political career 
Jensen has been a member of parliament (Folketinget) since 11 March 1998. He was the Venstre's spokesman on information technology and sports from 1998 to 2001 and became its spokesman on finance policy, as well as Vice-Chairman of the Financial Affairs Committee, in 2001. He was the Minister for Taxation from 2004 to 2010 and has been During his time as Tax Minister, Kristian Jensen was a keen proponent of a "tax freeze." At the liberal party's congress on 17 May 2009, Kristian Jensen was elected as deputy chairman of the liberal party, without any other candidates running for the post. In 2010 he stepped down as a member of the cabinet to focus on party organisational matters. He was a leading spokesman for the party during the time in opposition, from 2011 to 2015.

After the election for the Danish parliament in June 2015 Venstre was able to form a minority government, with Jensen becoming Minister of Foreign Affairs on 28 June 2015.
He was made Minister of Finance in 2016. On 31 August 2019 Lars Løkke Rasmussen stepped down as chairman of the party, and Jensen became acting chairman in his place. He was succeeded on 21 September 2019 by Jakob Ellemann-Jensen. 

In January 2021 he was appointed as political ambassador for the Danish Ministry of Foreign Affairs, set to secure Denmark a place in the UN Security Council.

Personal life
Until 2019, he was married to Trine Jensen. Since then, he has been married to singer Pernille Rosendahl.

Honours 
  Order of the Dannebrog, Commander

References

External links

 Official website
 Page on the Liberal Party's website
 Biography on the website of the Danish Parliament (Folketinget)

|-

|-

|-

1971 births
Living people
People from Middelfart Municipality
Commanders of the Order of the Dannebrog
Foreign ministers of Denmark
Danish Finance Ministers
Danish Tax Ministers
Government ministers of Denmark
Venstre (Denmark) politicians
Members of the Folketing 1998–2001
Members of the Folketing 2001–2005
Members of the Folketing 2005–2007
Members of the Folketing 2007–2011
Members of the Folketing 2011–2015
Members of the Folketing 2015–2019
Members of the Folketing 2019–2022
Leaders of Venstre (Denmark)